Chlamydopus is a genus of fungi in the family Agaricaceae. It was circumscribed by Carlos Luigi Spegazzini in 1898.

See also
List of Agaricales genera
List of Agaricaceae genera

References

Agaricaceae
Agaricales genera